Tibetan Volunteers for Animals or TVA is an environmental group in parts of India and Tibet which aim to improve the quality and treatment of wild animals such as the yak in Tibet by encouraging local people to become vegetarian or to restrict their intake of meat.

The group has been involved in various information campaigns since 2000.

Some issues of TVA's magazine Semchen, in Tibetan and English, highlight the Buddha's teachings about living meat-free.

See also
List of organizations of Tibetans in exile

References

External links 
 Tibetal Volunteers for Animals

Vegetarian organizations
Animal welfare organizations based in Tibet
Animal charities
Buddhist vegetarianism
Vegetarianism in China
Animals in Buddhism